The Decline and Fall of Nokia is a company profile book detailing the collapse of the mobile phone company Nokia. The author is David J. Cord, an American expatriate living in Finland.

Summary
The book covers the history of the company Nokia from 2006 to 2013, during the upheaval in the mobile device industry caused by newcomers Apple, Google and low-cost competitors. To a lesser extent it also covers Nokia Solutions and Networks, then a joint venture called Nokia Siemens Networks, during the same period. 

The main focus of the book is Nokia's decline in the mobile device industry, which culminated in the sale of the handset division to Microsoft. According to the book major reasons for Nokia's decline include a pervasive bureaucracy leading to an inability to act, destructive internal competition and the failure to realize the importance of lifestyle products like the iPhone. Other factors include the company's weakness in North America and the botched attempt to move out of hardware into services with Ovi (Nokia). The book refutes the idea that Nokia was unable to innovate, saying that incompetent middle management hampered attempts to bring innovations to market. 

Cord spreads the blame for Nokia's fall onto former CEO Olli-Pekka Kallasvuo, and the company's faulty organisational structure.  According to the book, the reason Nokia declined to switch to Android was because Samsung was much stronger and executives were afraid to compete against them in that ecosystem. 

The author discusses a theory that skewed decision making during the tenure as CEO of Stephen Elop was due to his conscious desire to do deals specially favorable to his former employer of Microsoft; Cord admits that Elop’s actions appear suspicious, but maintains that they were all logical at the time in the eyes of subordinate Nokia executives who agreed with the decisions

Development
After the completion of the author’s first book in 2012, Mohamed 2.0: Disruption Manifesto, his Finnish publisher asked him to write a book about Nokia. Cord initially declined, because he was working on a novel and thought the time wasn’t right to write about the company. When his novel was completed he began work on The Decline and Fall of Nokia.

Reception
The book generated considerable attention from the press as it claims Sun Microsystems' co-founder Scott McNealy had been offered the job of Nokia CEO in 2010 but declined. The board of directors next looked to promote long-time Nokia executive Anssi Vanjoki, but were stymied by major American investors, including Morgan Stanley, who demanded an outsider be chosen. The board’s third choice, according to the book, was Stephen Elop of Microsoft. Scott McNealy issued a statement, doubting that he was the "dream candidate" to succeed Kallasvuo and that he was never offered the job. 

The process of choosing the CEO in 2010 had previously been wrapped in secrecy, so there was much speculation about Cord’s sources of information. One publication wondered if long-time chairman of the board Jorma Ollila had been the leak.

References

External links
 Finnish publisher’s official site
 American marketer’s official site

Books about computer and internet companies
2014 non-fiction books
Nokia